Mount Holly Cotton Mill, also known as Alsace Manufacturing Co., is a historic cotton mill complex located at Mount Holly, Gaston County, North Carolina.  The original section was built in 1875, and is a 3 story, rectangular brick mill building with Industrial Italianate detailing.  A three-story addition was built in 1916, and a one-story, T-plan brick machine shop and boiler house was added in 1919.  The complex was converted into a research unit in 1953, and in 1973 was sold to an independent mill operator who presently uses the building for a variety of industrial and commercial purposes.

It was listed on the National Register of Historic Places in 1996.

References

Cotton mills in the United States
Industrial buildings and structures on the National Register of Historic Places in North Carolina
Italianate architecture in North Carolina
Industrial buildings completed in 1875
Buildings and structures in Gaston County, North Carolina
National Register of Historic Places in Gaston County, North Carolina
1875 establishments in North Carolina